Majrah is a district in Helmand Province, Afghanistan.

References 

Majrah

Districts of Helmand Province